Robert Daniel Morris (born October 19, 1943) is an American composer and music theorist.

Work in music theory
As a music theorist, Morris's work has bridged an important gap between the rigorously academic and the highly experimental. Born in Cheltenham, England, in 1943, Morris received his musical education at the Eastman School of Music (B.M. in composition with distinction) and the University of Michigan (M.M. and D.M.A. in composition and ethnomusicology), where he studied composition with John La Montaine, Leslie Bassett, Ross Lee Finney, and Eugene Kurtz. At Tanglewood, as a Margret Lee Crofts Fellow, he worked with Gunther Schuller. Morris has taught composition, electronic music, and music theory at the University of Hawaii and at Yale University, where he was Chairman of the Composition Department and Director of the Yale Electronic Music Studio. He was also Director of the Computer and Electronic Studio, Director of Graduate (music) Studies, and Associate Professor of Music at the University of Pittsburgh. In 1980 Morris joined the faculty of the Eastman School of Music where he currently teaches as Professor of Composition. (He was chair of the Composition Department from 1999–2005 and before that a member of both the composition and music theory departments.) Other teaching posts have included positions at the Philadelphia College of the Performing Arts, the Governor's School for the Arts held at Bucknell University, the University of Pittsburgh Computer Music Workshop, and the Berkshire Music Center at Tanglewood.

Written works

Musical compositions
Morris has written music for a wide variety of musical forms and media. He has composed over 160 works including computer and improvisational music. Much of his output from the 1970s is influenced by non-Western music and uses structural principles from Arabic, Indian, Indonesian, Japanese, and early Western musics. While such influences are less noticeable in his more recent works, the temporal and ornamental qualities of Eastern music have permanently affected Morris's style. Moreover, Morris has found much resonance among his musical aesthetics, his experiences in hiking (especially in the Southwestern United States), his study and appreciation of Carnatic Music of South India, and his reading of ancient Indian, Chinese, and Japanese Buddhist texts. Among his present compositional projects is a series of the works to be played outdoors in a natural setting. Seven of these works are complete and have been performed: Playing Outside (2000), Coming Down to Earth (2002), Oracle (2005), Sound/Path/Field (2006), Arboretum (2009), Sun, Moon, Earth (2012) and Four Gardens (2014). A new work for wind ensemble outdoors was premiered on Sunday September 18, 2022 by the Eastman Wind Ensemble at Durand Eastman Park in Rochester, New York. This new composition is entitled Sounds, Trees, Meadows and was premiered as a part of the Centennial celebration of the Eastman School of Music.

Books
In addition to his music, Morris has written three books and over 50 articles and reviews which have appeared in the Journal of Music Theory, In Theory Only, Music Theory Spectrum, Journal of the American Musicology Society, and Perspectives of New Music, contributing to theories of musical analysis and aesthetics, compositional design, and electronic and computer music. Morris was the recipient of the "Outstanding Publication Award" of the Society for Music Theory in 1988 for his book, Composition with Pitch-Classes: A Theory of Compositional Design, published by Yale University Press, and in 2001 for his article "Voice Leading Spaces" in Music Theory Spectrum 20/2. Advanced Class Notes for Atonal Theory, is available from Frog Peak Music. Morris is currently co-editor of Perspectives of New Music and contributing editor of The Open Space Magazine. His most recent book is The Whistling Blackbird: Essays and Talks on New Music (2010).

Notable students

References

Further reading
 Alegant, Brian. 2014. "On Robert Morris's Refrains". Perspectives of New Music 52, no. 2: 42–65.
 Barkin, Elaine. 2014. "Liner Notes in the Form of a Suite". Perspectives of New Music 52, no. 2: 14–16.
 Brody, Martin. 2006. "Down to Earth: Robert Morris's Restaging of the Sublime". The Open Space Magazine, nos. 8–9 (Fall–Spring): 74–81.
 Czerner, Dorota. 2014. "A poem for Robert Morris at 70'". Perspectives of New Music 52, no. 2: 26–30.
 Dembski, Stephen. 1989. "The Context of Composition: The Reception of Robert Morris's Theory of Compositional Design". Theory and Practice 14–15:187–202.
 Forshee, Jon. 2004. "Reflex-Ions of Robert Morris' Four or Five Mirrors". The Open Space Magazine, no. 6 (Fall): 144–50.
 Hanninen, Dora. 2014. "Nature and Composition in Robert Morris's Indoor Music: On strange flowers, occasional storms". Perspectives of New Music 52, no. 2: 66–85.
 Hanninen, Dora. 2003. "A Theory of Recontextualization in Music: Analyzing Phenomenal Transformations of Repetition". Music Theory Spectrum 25, no.2: 59-98.
 Haskins, Rob. 2014. "Differing Evocations of Buddhism in Two Works by Robert Morris and John Cage". Perspectives of New Music 52, no. 2: 345–58.
 Leong, Daphne. 2014. "Time's 'Suchness' in Morris's Clear Sounds". Perspectives of New Music 52, no. 2: 195–225.
 Lofthouse, Marcus, and Brian Alegant. 2002. "Having Your Cake and Eating It Too: The Property of Reflection in Twelve-Tone Rows, or, Further Extensions on the Mallalieu Complex". Perspectives of New Music 40, no. 2 (Summer): 233–72.
 Plylar, David Henning. 2014. "Poset-ting the Phronetic: Coming to Rowing Terms in Robert Morris's Doubles and Pairs". Perspectives of New Music 52, no. 2: 226–48.
 Ravikiran, Chitravina N. 2014. "Robert Morris and the concept of Melharmony". Perspectives of New Music 52, no. 2: 154–61.
 Scotto, Ciro. 2014. "The Interpretation of a Musical Language from the Perspective of a Compositional Unit". Perspectives of New Music 52, no. 2: 325–44.
 Shultis, Christopher. 2014. "Robert Morris and the Missing Middle". Perspectives of New Music 52, no. 2: 316–24.
 Slawson, Wayne. 2014. "To Know Robert Morris's MA". Perspectives of New Music 52, no. 2: 259–72.
 Straus, Joseph N. 2014. "An Analytical Example for Bob". Perspectives of New Music 52, no. 2: 162–68.

External links
Eastman School of Music: Robert Morris biography page
Interview with Robert Morris, NewMusicBox
Article about Robert Morris, Rochester City Newspaper

1943 births
American male classical composers
American classical composers
American music theorists
Living people
Twelve-tone and serial composers
University of Michigan School of Music, Theatre & Dance alumni
Eastman School of Music alumni